Fasciclia is a genus of soft corals in the family Xeniidae.

Species
The World Register of Marine Species lists the following species:

Fasciclia lobata Janes, 2008
Fasciclia ofwegeni Janes, 2008

References

Xeniidae
Octocorallia genera